Phoebe Baroody Stanton (1914–2003) was an American architectural historian, professor and urban planner. She taught at Johns Hopkins University, from 1955 until 1982. Stanton was outspoken about the architectural history and design for the city of Baltimore. She wrote and published three books.

Biography 
Phoebe Baroody was born in 1914 in Carroll County, Illinois, into a Lebanese-American family. She was raised in Chicago. At the age of 14, she traveled to Lebanon for the first time.

She received her B.A. degree in 1937 from Mount Holyoke College, and her M.A. degree in 1939 from Radcliffe College. She attended Stanford University for additional graduate work. During World War II, she worked for the Board of Economic Securities. She received her PhD in 1950 from Courtauld Institute of Art at the University of London. At Courtauld, she studied under Nikolaus Pevsner and John Summerson.

She was married to Daniel J. Stanton, a city planner; and in 1954 they moved to Chinquapin Parkway in Baltimore. Stanton was an outspoken supporter of Baltimore's architecture and advised the city on design. In 1963, she became involved with the city's planning and preservation issues.

She was faculty and taught at Johns Hopkins University, from 1955 until 1982. She also occasionally taught at Reed, Goucher, and Bryn Mawr colleges.

Stanton died at 88 on September 24, 2003, in a Baltimore hospital due to complications from heart disease and emphysema.

Publications

References 

1914 births
2003 deaths
American people of Lebanese descent
Mount Holyoke College alumni
Radcliffe College alumni
Alumni of the Courtauld Institute of Art
American architectural historians
Johns Hopkins University faculty
Women art historians
People from Carroll County, Illinois
Academics from Chicago
American urban planners
Historians from Illinois